The Mickens House is a historic house located in West Palm Beach, Florida. It is locally significant as one of the oldest surviving residences in West Palm Beach.

Description and history 
The building is basically an American four square in plan and design. Distinguishing features include a front porch which spans the first floor of the main elevation and the awnings which shield each window opening and the porch.

On April 11, 1985, it was added to the National Register of Historic Places. It is also a contributing property to the Northwest Historic District.

References

External links
 Palm Beach County listings at National Register of Historic Places
 Palm Beach County listings at Florida's Office of Cultural and Historical Programs

Houses on the National Register of Historic Places in Florida
National Register of Historic Places in Palm Beach County, Florida
Houses in Palm Beach County, Florida
Vernacular architecture in Florida
Houses completed in 1917